Gertrude Jekyll  (29 November 1843 – 8 December 1932) was a British horticulturist, garden designer, craftswoman, photographer, writer and artist.  She created over 400 gardens in the United Kingdom, Europe and the United States, and wrote over 1000 articles for magazines such as Country Life and William Robinson's The Garden. Jekyll has been described as "a premier influence in garden design" by British and American gardening enthusiasts.

Early life 
Jekyll was born at 2 Grafton Street, Mayfair, London, the fifth of the seven children of Captain Edward Joseph Hill Jekyll, Esquire, an officer in the Grenadier Guards, and his wife Julia, née Hammersley. In 1848 her family left London and moved to Bramley House in Surrey, where she spent her formative years. She never married and had no children.

Her younger brother, Walter Jekyll (an Anglican priest; sometime Minor Canon of Worcester Cathedral and Chaplain of Malta), was a friend of Robert Louis Stevenson who borrowed the family name for his 1886 novella Strange Case of Dr Jekyll and Mr Hyde.

Themes 

Jekyll was one half of one of the most influential and historical partnerships of the Arts and Crafts movement, thanks to her association with the English architect Edwin Lutyens, for whose projects she created numerous landscapes and who designed her home Munstead Wood, near Godalming in Surrey. (In 1900, Lutyens and Jekyll's brother Herbert designed the British Pavilion for the Paris Exposition.)

Jekyll is remembered for her outstanding designs and subtle, painterly approach to the arrangement of the gardens she created, particularly her "hardy flower borders". Her work is known for its radiant colour and the brush-like strokes of her plantings; it is suggested by some that the Impressionistic-style schemes may have been due to Jekyll's deteriorating eyesight, which largely put an end to her career as a painter and watercolourist. Her artistic ability had been evident when she was a child and she had trained as an artist.

She was one of the first of her profession to take into account the colour, texture, and experience of gardens as aspects of her designs. Jekyll's theory of how to design with colour was influenced by painter J.M.W. Turner and by Impressionism, and by the theoretical colour wheel. Her focus on gardening began at South Kensington School of Art,
where she became interested in the creative art of planting, and more specifically, gardening. Jekyll later returned to her childhood home in the village of Bramley to design a garden in Snowdenham Lane called Millmead.

Not wanting to limit her influence to teaching the practice of gardening, Jekyll incorporated in her work the theory of gardening and an understanding of the plants themselves. Her writing was influenced by her friend Theresa Earle who had published her "Pot-pourri" books. In works like Colour Schemes for the Flower Garden (reprinted 1988) she put her imprint on modern uses of "warm" and "cool" flower colours in gardens. Her concern that plants should be displayed to best effect even when cut for the house, led her to design her own range of glass flower vases.

Later in life, Jekyll collected and contributed a vast array of plants solely for the purpose of preservation to numerous institutions across Britain. At the time of her death, she had designed over 400 gardens in Britain, Europe and a few in North America. Jekyll was also known for her prolific writing. She wrote over fifteen books, ranging from Wood and Garden and her most famous book, Colour in the Flower Garden, to memoirs of her youth.

She was also interested in traditional cottage furnishings and rural crafts, and concerned that they were disappearing. Her book Old West Surrey (1904) records many aspects of 19th-century country life, with over 300 photographs taken by Jekyll.

Gardens 

From 1881, when she laid out the gardens for Munstead House, built for her mother by John James Stevenson, Jekyll provided designs or planned planting for some four hundred gardens. More than half were directly commissioned, but many were created in collaboration with architects such as Lutyens and Robert Lorimer. Most of her gardens are lost. A small number have been restored, including her own garden at Munstead Wood, the gardens of Hestercombe House, and those of Woolverstone House and the Manor House in Upton Grey that she designed for the magazine editor Charles Holme.

Awards 
Jekyll was awarded the Victoria Medal of Honour of the Royal Horticultural Society in 1897 and the Veitch Memorial Medal of the society in 1929. Also in 1929, she was given the George Robert White Medal of Honor of the Massachusetts Horticultural Society.

Burial 

Jekyll was buried in the churchyard of St John the Baptist, Busbridge, Godalming, next to her brother, Herbert Jekyll, and his wife, the artist, writer and philanthropist Dame Agnes Jekyll. The Jekyll family memorial was designed by Edwin Lutyens.

Legacy
In 1907, Jekyll donated her collection of traditional household items and objects relating to "Old Surrey" to the Surrey Archaeological Society. Much of this donation is still on display at Guildford Museum. In 1911, the Corporation of Guildford built an extension to the museum to house the collection. Some artefacts associated with her life and work are also housed there.

On 29 November 2017, which would have been Jekyll's 174th birthday, a Google Doodle was released honouring her.

Books 

 Wood and Garden (Longmans, Green and Co., 1899).
 Home and Garden (Longmans, Green and Co., 1900).
 (with E. Mawley) Roses for English Gardens (London: Country Life, 1902).
 Wall and Water Gardens (London: Country Life, 1902).
 Lilies for English Gardens (London: Country Life, 1903).
 (with illustrations by George S. Elgood) Some English Gardens (Longmans, Green & Co., 1904)
 Old West Surrey (Longmans, Green, and Co., 1904).
 Colour in the Flower Garden (London: Country Life, 1908).
 Annuals & Biennials (London: Country Life, 1916)
 Children and Gardens (London: Country Life, 1908).
 (with Lawrence Weaver) Gardens for Small Country Houses (London: Country Life, 1914).
 Colour Schemes for the Flower Garden (London: Country Life, 1919).

See also 

 The Bois des Moutiers (she designed some gardens of the Bois des Moutiers)
 Garden design
 Ralph Hancock (landscape gardener)
 Hascombe Court (designed by Jekyll)
 History of gardening
 Planting design
 Garden of Eden, Venice, the garden of Jekyll's sister Caroline

References

Further reading

External links 

 The Gertrude Jekyll Estate
 Restored Jekyll garden in Sandwich, Kent
 Restored Jekyll garden at Upton Grey
 Short biography of Jekyll from Emily Compost
 Online text of Gertrude Jekyll's Colour schemes for the flower garden (1921)
 Restored Jekyll garden at Durmast House, Burley, Hampshire, UK
 Jekyll garden in Woodbury CT, USA
 Gertrude Jekyll's garden designs @ Ward's Book of Days
 The Times Obituary
 A Gertrude Jekyll and Edwin Lutyens garden in France (1898)
 Detailed family history
 Connection between Jekyll, Eden, Baring, Hammersley and Poulett-Thomson families
 Jekyll (Gertrude) Collection, 1877–1931
 
 
 

1843 births
1932 deaths
People from the Borough of Waverley
Arts and Crafts movement artists
English garden writers
English landscape and garden designers
English gardeners
English rose horticulturists
English horticulturists
 
Veitch Memorial Medal recipients
Victoria Medal of Honour recipients
Women of the Victorian era
Gardens in Hampshire
Robert Louis Stevenson
19th-century English women writers
20th-century English people
Country Life (magazine) people